Alan Weiss (born 1946) is an American entrepreneur, author, and public speaker.

Background 
Alan Weiss was born in Hoboken, New Jersey in 1946. He spent his childhood in Union City, New Jersey, and graduated from Emerson High School in 1964. He received degrees in political science from Rutgers, where he was elected to the National Political Science Association Honor Society, and from Montclair University. He was an award-winning editor-in-chief at Rutgers' newspaper, The Observer, winning eight awards including first place in editorial writing in the New Jersey Collegiate Press Association competition.

Weiss joined Prudential Insurance in 1968 and was recruited by the Princeton consulting firm, Kepner-Tregoe, in 1972. In his 11-year career with the consulting firm, he went on to run the Asian, Latin American, and North American Divisions. He was recruited in 1983 to become president of Walter V. Clarke Associates, a behavioral consulting firm in Providence, Rhode Island.

Business ventures 
Weiss formed the Summit Consulting Group, Inc. in 1985, specializing in human and organizational performance. Clients for the consulting group include Merck, Hewlett-Packard, JP Morgan Chase, Bank of America, Allianz Insurance, The New York Times, Mercedes-Benz and Toyota. Additionally, Weiss launched a professional speaking career that has taken him to 60 countries.

Weiss has held a position as an adjunct professor at the University of Rhode Island on strategy and consulting, and has been a visiting lecturer at Georgia University's Graduate School of Business, Case Western Reserve, Boston College, Tufts, the Institute of Management Studies, and the University of Illinois.

Honors and awards 
Weiss has received the Lifetime Achievement Award from the American Press Institute, one of only seven people in their history and the sole non-journalist honored.

The Institute of Management Consultants has recognized him as a Certified Management Consultant and has named him a Fellow of the Institute.

The National Speakers Association has recognized him as a Certified Speaking Professional (CSP) and has elected him to their Speakers Hall of Fame, making him one of only two people in history to be honored by both the IMC as a Fellow and NSA as a Hall of Fame member.

Weiss has a non-traditional PhD in Organizational Psychology from California Coast University.

He has served as Chair of the Newport International Film Festival, and on the boards of Trinity Repertory Company, Festival Ballet, and Harvard University's Center for Mental Health and the Media.

He is a recipient of the Axiem Award for excellence in audio presentation.

Publishing 
As of April 2017, Weiss has published 64 books on consulting. His books have appeared on the curricula of the Wharton School of Business, Temple University, and Villanova University.

His best-seller, Million Dollar Consulting (McGraw-Hill) has been through five editions over 25 years. His books currently appear in 12 languages.

Bibliography

References

External links 
 Alan Weiss on Million Dollar Launch

1946 births
Living people
Rutgers University alumni
Montclair State University alumni
American business writers